Major General Jack Nziza is Inspector-General of the Rwanda Defence Force. He has also served as Permanent Secretary of the Ministry of Defence.

, founding member of the AFDL, the coalition that would bring down Mobutu Sese Seko as the President of Zaire in 1997, was assassinated on 6 January 1997. Disagreements within the AFDL leadership led to the killing. Nziza has been mentioned by a source close to Ngandu as the perpetrator of the assassination, ordered by AFDL Chairman Laurent-Désiré Kabila.

References

External links
(All Africa)
(Rwanda government)

Rwandan generals
Living people
Year of birth missing (living people)